Pušča (locally Püšča) is a village in the Municipality of Murska Sobota in the Prekmurje region of northeastern Slovenia. It is a Romani village.

History
Pušča became a separate settlement in 2002, when it was administratively separated from Černelavci.

References

External links 
 Pušča on Geopedia

Populated places in the City Municipality of Murska Sobota